Güney may refer to:

Given name
 Güney Dal (born 1944), Turkish-German writer

Surname
 Alican Güney (born 1989), Turkish professional basketball player
 İsmet Güney (1932–2009), Cypriot artist
 Mehmet Güney (born 1936), Turkish judge
 Ramadan Güney (1932–2006), British-Turkish Cypriot businessman and politician
 Sadullah Güney (1883–1945), officer of the Ottoman Army and of the Turkish Army
 Salih Güney (born 1945), Turkish film actor
 Tuncay Güney (born 1972), Turkish spy
 Yusuf Güney (born 1984), Turkish singer
 Yılmaz Güney (1937–1984), Turkish film director

See also 
 Güney (disambiguation)

Turkish-language surnames